Anthaspidellidae is an extinct family of sponges whose dendroclone spicules form ladder-like trabs.

References

Sponge families
Tetractinomorpha